The 2020–21 Liga Primera de Nicaragua season was divided into two tournaments, Apertura and Clausura. The season determined the 75th and 76th champions in the history of the Liga Primera de Nicaragua, the top division of football in Nicaragua. The Apertura tournament was played in the second half of 2020, while the Clausura was played in the first half of 2021.

Format
The Apertura playoff format was changed from previous years, while the Clausura used the same 4-team playoff format. For the Apertura, the top four teams from the regular stage advanced to a "quadrangular" double-round robin instead of a playoff stage. The regular stage and quadrangular winners played to decide the tournament's champion, but ultimately the same team won both and the final was not necessary. The same format was recently adopted by the Costa Rican Primera División, but for both half seasons.

Team information 

A total of ten teams contested the league, including nine sides from the 2019–20 Primera División, and one side from the 2019–20 Segunda División.

UNAN Managua finished last in the aggregate table and were relegated to the Segunda División. The champions from the Segunda División, Deportivo Las Sabanas, were promoted in their place.

The 9th place team in the aggregate table, ART Jalapa, faced the second-place team from the Segunda División, Deportivo Masaya, in a playoff for a spot in the Primera División. ART Jalapa won 4–3 over two legs, meaning ART Jalapa remained in Primera División.

Promotion and relegation 

Promoted from Segunda División as of May, 2020.

 Champions: Junior de Managua

Relegated to Segunda División  as of May, 2020.

 Last Place: Deportivo Las Sabanas

Other News

New Ball Provider
VOIT will be providing and major ball sponsor for 2020-2021

Managerial Changes

Pre Season Apertura 2020

During the Apertura season

Pre Season Apertura 2020

Clausura 2021

Apertura

Personnel and sponsoring

Standings

Results

Finals

Quarterfinals 

Chinandega progressed.

Diriangen progressed.

Semi-finals 

 Diriagen won 6-3 on aggregate.

Real Esteli won 3–2 on aggregate.

Final

Clausura

Standings

Finals

Quarterfinals 

Walter Ferretti progressed 3-0.

Managua progressed 1-0.

Semi-finals 

 Diriagen won 3-1 on aggregate.

5-5. Managua won 5-5 on aggregate away goal(s).

Final

List of foreign players in the league 
This is a list of foreign players in the 2020–21 season. The following players:

 Have played at least one game for the respective club.
 Have not been capped for the Nicaragua national football team on any level, independently from the birthplace

A new rule was introduced this season, that clubs can have four foreign players per club and can only add a new player if there is an injury or a player/s is released, and it is before the closing of the season transfer window.

ART Jalapa
  Gabriel Coelho 
  Ronaldo Pabon 
  Juan Daniel González 
  Edder Mondragón (*)
  Eder García 
  Brayan Zúñiga (*)
  Yeiner Marcelo Vivas (*)

Chinandega
  Brayan Cañate
  Marlon Barrios
  Duver Quinonez
  Esteban Lozada
  Cristhian Izaguirre

Diriangén
  Jonathan Pacheco
  Marel Álvarez
  Pedro Dos Santos
  Maycon Santana
  Bernando Laureiro
  Jhon Mosquera

Juventus Managua
  Rafael Vieira 
  Alexander Moreno
  Cristhian Euseda 
  Carlos Felix
 
Managua
  Lucas Dos Santos 
  Edward Morillo
  Pablo Gállego
  Diego Pelaez 
  Marcos González 
  Brayan Castillo  
  Leandro Figueroa 

Ocotal
  Allan Gutiérrez
  Kenverlen López
  Brayan Cantillo Lucumi 
  Jerney Vente

Real Estelí
  Lucio Barroca 
  Alvaro Rezzano
  Luis Acuna
  Rodrigo Bronzatti
  Vitor Faiska
  Niko Kato
  Jhon Mosquera 

Real Madriz
  Jamilton Moreno
  Nicolas Quinonez
  Bryan Mojica
  Jorge Moreno

Junior de Managua
  Carlos Mosquera
  Edson Contreras
  Luis Carbajal
  Rogelio Espinoza

Walter Ferretti
  Taufic Guarch
  Christiano Fernandes de Lima 
  Fernando Villalpando 
  Sergio Napoles

 (player released during the Apertura season)
 (player released between the Apertura and Clausura seasons)
 (player released during the Clausura season)

References

External links
 Fútbol de Primera – Futbol Nica

Nicaraguan Primera División seasons
1
Nicaragua